Ilișești is a commune located in Suceava County, Bukovina, northeastern Romania. It is composed of two villages, namely Brașca and Ilișești. The commune was called Ciprian Porumbescu (with Ilișești village its center) and included Bălăceana and Ciprian Porumbescu villages until 2004, when these were split off to form separate communes.

Late modern period history 

During the 1780s, 12 ethnic German families settled in Ilișești in the course of the Josephine colonization. These ethnic Germans were part of the then emerging Bukovina German community which was formed in Suceava County and the entire historical region of Bukovina during the late Modern Age, more specifically during the Habsburg period and, respectively, the Austro-Hungarian period.

Administration and local politics

Commune council 

The commune's current local council has the following political composition, according to the results of the 2020 Romanian local elections:

Gallery

References 

Communes in Suceava County
Localities in Southern Bukovina